"Tonight" is a song from the 1957 musical West Side Story with music written by Leonard Bernstein and lyrics by Stephen Sondheim. It was published in 1956.

Description 
The song is a love duet between the protagonists Tony and Maria, sung while Tony visits Maria on the fire escape outside her apartment. West Side Story is a modernized adaptation of Shakespeare's Romeo and Juliet set in 20th-century New York; the scene in which "Tonight" appears is the adaptation of Romeo and Juliet'''s famous "balcony scene".

 History 
Originally the song for the balcony scene was to have been "One Hand, One Heart". It was felt that this song was too innocent for two teenagers in love, and so it was decided to take this tune, which hitherto only existed as the overarching phrase from the "Tonight Quintet" and use it as the tune for the balcony scene.

In the original 1957 Broadway production of West Side Story, "Tonight" was performed by Larry Kert and Carol Lawrence in the roles of Tony and Maria. In the 1961 film adaptation of the musical, the song was performed by Marni Nixon (dubbing Natalie Wood as Maria) and Jimmy Bryant (dubbing Richard Beymer as Tony). This rendition of the song is listed at number 59 on AFI's 100 Years...100 Songs survey of top tunes in American cinema. In the 2021 film adaptation, it was performed by Rachel Zegler as Maria and Ansel Elgort as Tony, and was released as digital download single of the film's soundtrack album on December 1, 2021.

 Cover versions 
 The song was released in 1961 as a single in versions by Ferrante & Teicher (number 8 pop, number 2 easy listening)
 Eddie Fisher recorded his own version (also in 1961), which narrowly missed the Top 40.
 Shirley Bassey recorded the song in 1962, where it peaked at number 21 on the UK Singles Chart, becoming the only recording of this song to chart in the UK.
 Andy Williams released a version on his 1962 album, Moon River and Other Great Movie Themes.
 Sergio Franchi recorded the song in his 1963 RCA Records Red Seal album, Broadway, I Love You.
 The Drifters released the song on their 1965 album, The Good Life With the Drifters. We Five released the song on their 1966 album, You Were on My Mind.
 Porno for Pyros recorded a non-album version in 1993 during the Porno for Pyros album sessions. It was initially only made available as a B-side on the Pets (song)'' singles.

See also 
 Tonight Quintet

References 

1956 songs
Songs from West Side Story
Male–female vocal duets
Songs written by Stephen Sondheim